In economics, the Lerner paradox is the theoretical possibility that imposing tariffs raises the world price of the import good, causing a deterioration of the tariff-imposing country's terms of trade. Abba Lerner showed the possibility in his 1936 article.

Conditions
In the large country case of a perfectly competitive market, imposing tariffs reduces the world price of the import good, improving the tariff-imposing country's terms of trade. However, under certain conditions, tariffs can have an opposite effect. Therefore, it is called a paradox. 

According to Gene Grossman, a Lerner paradox occurs when the government spends most of its tariff revenue to purchase the import good.
According to Pan-Long Tsai, a Lerner paradox occurs when the elasticity of the tariff-imposing country's import demand function is smaller than the government's spending share of its tariff revenue on the import good.
Regarding the effect of tariffs on terms of trade, there is another paradox called the Metzler paradox. Koichi Hamada and Masahiro Endoh employ a general equilibrium model with multiple goods to demonstrate the conditions that both a Lerner paradox and a Metzler paradox do not occur. There is a study building a model with quality and markups to explain both Lerner paradox and Metzler paradox within a single framework.
Abba Lerner's 1936 article, demonstrating the possibility of a Lerner paradox, also shows the Lerner symmetry theorem.

See also
International trade theory
Tariffs
Lerner symmetry theorem
Metzler paradox
List of paradoxes

References

International trade theory
Paradoxes in economics